FRCC may refer to:

 Fellow of the Royal College of Chiropractors
 Fell & Rock Climbing Club
 Florida Reliability Coordinating Council
 Forerunner Christian Center
 Fox River Classic Conference
 Front Range Community College